Rattler Kid is a 1967 Italian-Argentine western film directed by León Klimovsky, scored by Francesco De Masi, and starring Richard Wyler, Jesús Puente, Brad Harris, and Aurora del Alba.

Cast

References

External links
 

1967 Western (genre) films
Films directed by León Klimovsky
Argentine Western (genre) films
Italian Western (genre) films
Films scored by Francesco De Masi
1960s Italian films